The Bahama Archipelago, also known as the Lucayan Archipelago, is an island group comprising the Commonwealth of The Bahamas and the British Overseas Territory of the Turks and Caicos Islands. The archipelago is in the western North Atlantic Ocean, north of Cuba along with the other Antilles, and east and southeast of Florida. The archipelago has experienced the effects of at least 22 Atlantic hurricanes, or storms that were once tropical or subtropical cyclones, including 17 since 2000. The storms collectively killed 101 people.

Dorian was one of four Category 5 hurricanes to strike the Bahamas, the others being the 1932 Bahamas hurricane, the 1933 Cuba–Brownsville hurricane, and Hurricane Andrew in 1992. The most recent hurricane to strike the archipelago was Hurricane Nicole in 2022.

Pre-1900s
September 26, 1852 − The Great Mobile hurricane hits the southernmost portion of the archipelago as a minimal hurricane. Damage is unknown.
October 1853 − Hurricane Eight passes north of the Bahaman archipelago, killing 12 people in the islands.
August 15, 1871 − A major hurricane strikes the northernmost part of the archipelago, killing 23 people.

1900s
September 15–16, 1928 − The 1928 Okeechobee hurricane causes 21 fatalities in the archipelago.
September 5, 1932 - The 1932 Bahamas Hurricane strikes Great Abaco Island as a Category 5. Damage in Nassau, despite being just 65 miles from the hurricane, is minimal. However, on Great Abaco Island, winds of up to  battered the island. At Green Turtle Cay, a large storm surge inundated the entire island, flooding homes, churches, and businesses. At Green Turtle Cay alone, six people died while another 25 were injured. Multiple vessels to the north of Abaco Island also reported low pressure, one even reporting  while another vessel recorded .
August 29, 1933 - The 1933 Cuba–Brownsville hurricane moves over the southeastern Bahamas and Turks and Caicos Islands as a brief Category 5, with winds of 160 mph. The radius of hurricane-strength winds was small, as Grand Turk Island reported winds of only 56 mph.
Two luxury yachts were destroyed, while dozens of smaller boats were damaged. A man was killed in Nassau after his ship capsized at Nassau Harbor. In the Bay Street shopping district,  of water flooded the street. Many power lines and trees were blown down as a result of the strong winds, and many homes and businesses were damaged or destroyed. As a result of the strong winds, rain, and storm surge, $14 million (1965 USD) of damage was estimated, most of it being crop damage.
October 2–5, 1966 -Hurricane Inez stalls in The Bahamas, bringing with it heavy rainfall. In Nassau alone,  of rain is dropped while in Green Turtle Cay, Abaco,  of rain is dropped. A tornado also formed in Nassau, killing a 15-month-old child, and injuring two others. It was rated an EF1, with winds of over  being reported from an anemoter near the tornado. Overall, five people died and around $15.5 million (1966 USD) of damage was caused.
May 29, 1969 - Tropical Depression 5 tracks over the Abaco Islands. No impact is reported.
October 20–22, 1973 - Tropical Storm Gilda stalls south of the Abaco Islands, bringing heavy rainfall and winds to the islands forcing businesses and schools to close. There was some reported crop damage, but the overall losses are minor and nobody was killed.
Even with the rainfall and winds, the overall damage in The Bahamas is minor.
September 26, 1984 - Tropical Storm Isidore moves through the Bahamas before striking Florida, bring gusty conditions and heavy rainfall to the islands. In Nassau, floods and gales close businesses, schools and banks across the island. Even with the floods and gusty winds overall damage is minor and nobody is killed.

1990—1999
August 24, 1992 - Hurricane Andrew strikes Eleuthera with 160 mph winds (260 km/h) and early the next day passes through the southern Berry Islands with 150 mph winds (240 km/h). The storm causes $250 million worth of damage (1992 USD, $461 million in 2019 USD), with the most damage on Eleuthera and Cat Cays. 4 people were also killed in The Bahamas, with one of them being an indirect death.
September 23—24, 1998 - Hurricane Georges passed to the south of the archipelago, though forecasts from National Hurricane Center showed the storm making landfall in the archipelago while the storm was farther away. Georges brought  winds to Turks and Caicos Islands and South Andros, as well as precipitation in the storm's outer bands. Though damage was minimal, one person died in the country.
The strong winds caused widespread power outages as storm surge was pushed in, flooding roads and buildings. Trees were also downed or severely damaged as the storms center moved across the Abaco Islands. There were no deaths or injuries and the damage total is unknown.
A  storm surge inundated many islands with over five ft (1.5 m) of water throughout. The wind and waves toppled power and communication lines, severely disrupting electricity and telephone services for days. Damage was greatest at Abaco Island, Cat Island, San Salvador Island, and Eleuthera Island, where Floyd uprooted trees and destroyed a significant number of houses. Numerous restaurants, hotels, shops, and homes were devastated, severely limiting in the recovery period tourism on which many rely for economic well-being. Damaged water systems left tens of thousands across the archipelago without water, electricity, or food. Despite the damage, few deaths and injuries were reported, as only one person drowned in Freeport.

2000s

2000—2009
 November 5, 2001 - Hurricane Michelle weakened before hitting the Bahamas, bringing high winds and flooding. At its peak, almost 200,000 customers were without power as many trees fell down from strong winds. In Nassau, almost 12.64 inches of rainfall fell down, and, in New Providence Island, 5–8 feet of storm surge was pushed in. Overall, Michelle caused an estimated $300 million in damage (2001 USD), but there were no reported deaths.
 August 7, 2002 - Tropical Storm Cristobal brought showers and gusty winds to the northern islands of The Bahamas.
 August 13, 2003 - Hurricane Erika's precursor disturbance dropped heavy, yet needed rainfall to northwestern islands of The Bahamas.
 September 15—18, 2003 - Hurricane Isabel caused strong swells that lashed the Bahamas. During most hurricanes, the location of the Bahamas prevents powerful swells of Atlantic hurricanes from striking southeast Florida. However, the combination of the location, forward speed, and strength of Isabel produced strong swells through the Providence Channel.
 October 11, 2003 - Tropical Storm Mindy passed over the Turks and Caicos Islands on October 11, causing some rain and squally weather. Mindy had weakened to a tropical depression, as winds reached only  at Grand Turk Island.
 September 2, 2004 - Hurricane Frances roars through the Bahamas as a category 3, being the first storm since 1866 to impact the entire Bahama Archipelago. At its peak, around 75% of people living in the Bahamas lost power. On San Salvador Island in the Bahamas, between 13 and 17 percent of Australian Pine was lost, most because of snapping. Almost several feet of water was reported in the Freeport International Airport and many crops, including the banana and cool-season vegetables were destroyed.
 November 1, 2007 - Hurricane Noel moves through as a tropical storm, dropping heavy rainfall and bringing gusty winds. At one station in the Bahamas, almost  of rain was recorded while there were sustained winds up to 40 mph through central and northwestern parts of the Bahamas. The worst damage was reported in Long Island with floods up to 5 feet high. There was one death on Exuma when a man abandoned his truck and was then swept away.

2010—2019
July 17, 2011 - Tropical Storm Bret passes around 100 miles north of Grand Bahama Island, prompting tropical storm warnings for the northwestern Bahamas. Impacts were relatively minor, and a drought plaguing the island was relieved by the rainfall.
August 25, 2011 - Hurricane Irene struck the southeastern Bahamas along with the Turks and Caicos Islands. In the Turks and Caicos, the storm hit as a Category 1 hurricane, downing power lines and ripping off roofs. In the Bahamas, the storm made landfall as a Category 3, with the eye passing over several Bahamian Islands. Winds damaged dozens of buildings, while in Lovely Bay almost 90 percent of all buildings were wiped out. The worst of the damage was reported to be in Cat Cay. The overall damage was around $40 million (2011 USD, $46 million 2020 USD), though there were no fatalities or injuries reported.
October 1, 2015 - Hurricane Joaquin struck the southeastern Bahamas as a Category 4 hurricane. It was one of the strongest known hurricanes to impact the Bahamas, with effects comparable to Hurricane Andrew in 1992. Joaquin directly affected about 7,000 people in the archipelago, with 836 houses destroyed; this included 413 on Long Island, 227 on San Salvador, 123 on Acklins, 50 on Crooked Island, and 23 on Rum Cay. One man died during the storm on Long Island, his death was unrelated to the hurricane. Joaquin left about $200 million in damage across the Bahamian archipelago.
October 7, 2016 - Hurricane Matthew passed through the Bahamas, making a direct landfall on Grand Bahama. Strong winds took down trees and an estimated 95% percent of houses were severely damaged in Eight Mile Rock and Holmes Rock. On the backside of the hurricane, heavy rainfall flooded the Bahamas, damaging roads. Total damage is about $580 million in damage (2016 USD), but no deaths or injuries were reported.
September 7, 2017 - Hurricane Irma passed south of the Turks and Caicos Islands before hitting The Bahamas. Winds took out power over the Turks and Caicos, with communication infrastructure destroyed. On South Caicos, over 75% of buildings had lost their roofs, while the hospital in the capital of Cockburn Town was heavily damaged. In the Bahamas, the eye passed over Duncan Town, Inagua and South Acklin. Most damages were confined to Great Inagua and Mayaguana with power lines knocked down. On Crooked Island, Bahamas there was widespread roof damage, and outer rain bands caused tornadoes on Grand Bahama. Overall, damage was $635 million in damage (2017 USD).
July 22, 2019 - Tropical Depression Three moved across Andros Island shortly after its formation. The depression dropped locally heavy rainfall, reaching  in Freeport.

This made Dorian the first Category 5 hurricane to strike the Bahamas since 1992, and the strongest hurricane on record to strike the country. Precipitation reached  at Hope Town. Dorian killed at least 74 people, with another 245 missing as of April 2020. Property damage accounted for $2.5 billion; the nation suffered $717 million in economic losses; and $221 million was required for debris removal and cleaning a large oil spill.
September 14, 2019 - Tropical Storm Humberto passed just northeast of the Bahamas while moving northwestward, just two weeks after Dorian. Grand Bahama International Airport reported ten-minute sustained winds of just  as the storm passed to the east, and rainfall totals were light. Humberto's proximity to the disaster area caused small airfields being used in the distribution of emergency supplies to be closed briefly.

2020—present
May 16, 2020 - Tropical Storm Arthur formed just north of Grand Bahama Island. Gusty winds damaged tents and other temporary shelters across the island, and heavy rainfall caused some minimal flooding.
The storm caused moderate damage to property, namely storm surge and wind damage to trees and roofs. A few tents and temporary shelters were destroyed.
September 11, 2020 - Tropical Storm Sally forms as a tropical depression over Andros Island, bringing strong wind gusts and heavy rain along
 November 9-10, 2022: Hurricane Nicole makes landfall on Abaco Island as a strong tropical storm.

Climatology

Deadly storms
The following is a list of Atlantic tropical storms that caused fatalities in the Bahama Archipelago.

See also

Effects of Hurricane Dorian in The Bahamas
List of Cuba hurricanes
List of Cayman Islands hurricanes
List of Jamaica hurricanes
List of Hispaniola hurricanes
List of Florida hurricanes

References

Sources

Bahamas